Naphthomycins are a group of closely related antimicrobial chemical compounds isolated from Streptomyces.  They are considered a subclass of ansamycins.

Members include:

 Naphthomycin A
 Naphthomycin B
 Naphthomycin C
 Naphthomycin D
 Naphthomycin E
 Naphthomycin F
 Naphthomycin G
 Naphthomycin H
 Naphthomycin I
 Naphthomycin J
 Naphthomycin K
 Naphthomycin L
 Naphthomycin M
 Naphthomycin N

Chemical structures

References

Antimicrobials
1,4-Naphthoquinones
Ansamycins